Hooft or 't Hooft is a Dutch surname meaning "(the) head" (hoofd in modern Dutch). Notable people with the surname include:

Hooft
Cornelis Hooft (1547–1627), Dutch statesman, father of P.C. Hooft
Pieter Corneliszoon Hooft (1581–1647), Dutch historian, poet and playwright
 (1617–1678), Dutch mayor of Amsterdam, 
Catharina Hooft (1618–1691), woman of the Dutch Golden Age
Hendrik Daniëlsz Hooft (1716–1794), Dutch politician during the Patriottentijd
Jeannette Hooft (1888–1939), Dutch traveler, mountaineer, and writer
Henri Hooft (born 1969), Dutch kickboxer and trainer
't Hooft / Visser 't Hooft / Van 't Hooft
Willem Visser 't Hooft (1900–1985), Dutch theologian and the first secretary general of the World Council of Churches
Haas Visser 't Hooft (1905–1977), Dutch field hockey player
Francis van 't Hooft (born 1940), Dutch field hockey player
Gerard 't Hooft (born 1946), Dutch theoretical physicist and Nobel Laureate
Jotie T'Hooft (1956–1977), Flemish Belgian neo-romantic poet
Van Hooft / Van der Hooft
 (born 1941), Dutch Socialist Party politician
Anna Van Hooft (born 1980s), Canadian actress
Elroy van der Hooft (born 1990), Dutch football forward

See also
Named after Pieter Corneliszoon Hooft
, artificial islet in the IJmeer
P. C. Hooft Award, Dutch language literary lifetime achievement award
MV Pieter Corneliszoon Hooft, Dutch ocean liner built in 1925
Named after Gerard 't Hooft
9491 Thooft (without an apostrophe), a main-belt asteroid
Quantum field theory terminology:
't Hooft matching condition
't Hooft loop
't Hooft symbol
't Hooft–Polyakov monopole

References

Dutch-language surnames